The FIBT World Championships 1953 took place in Garmisch-Partenkirchen, West Germany for the third time after previously hosting the four-man event of the championships in 1934 and 1938. The event was marred by the death of Switzerland's Felix Endrich who won the two-man event gold medal only to die in competition during the four-man event a week later.

Two man bobsleigh

Gold medalist Endrich would die in the four-man event the following week.

Four man bobsleigh

Medal table

References
2-Man bobsleigh World Champions
4-Man bobsleigh World Champions

IBSF World Championships
Sport in Garmisch-Partenkirchen
1953 in bobsleigh
International sports competitions hosted by West Germany
Bobsleigh in Germany 
1953 in German sport